NARM was the National Association of Recording Merchandisers, now renamed as the Music Business Association. NARM may also refer to:

North American Reciprocal Museums
North American Registry of Midwives, a certifying organization for midwives
National Area of Retired Mills, a farcical fiction cited as the destination for historic windmills in Pigeon (Pushing Daisies) season 1, episode 4 of the short-lived television series, Pushing Daisies.